Orthogonius rufotestaceus is a species of ground beetle in the subfamily Orthogoniinae. It was described by G.Muller in 1941.

References

rufotestaceus
Beetles described in 1941